Look at You Now may refer to:

"Look At You Now", a song by Blue Ash
"Look at You Now", a song by Buzzcocks on their 2006 album Flat-Pack Philosophy
"Look at You Now", a song by Catie Curtis on her 1999 album A Crash Course in Roses
"Look At You Now", a song by Noel MacNeal and Tyler Bunch in Bear in the Big Blue House
"Look At You Now", a 2004 song by Ciccone
"Look at You Now", a song by E.M.D. on their 2008 album A State of Mind
"Look At You Now", a song by Golden Smog on their 2007 album Blood on the Slacks
"Look at You Now", a song by Hardline on their 2012 album Danger Zone
"Look At You Now", a song by Ray Toro on his 2016 album Remember the Laughter
"Look at You Now", a song by Simply Red on their 1985 album Picture Book
"Look at You Now", a song by Yngwie Malmsteen on his 2010 album Relentless